Marx after Sraffa is a 1977 book about Marxist economics by the economist Ian Steedman, in which the author argues against the labor theory of value.

Reception
The economist Heinz D. Kurz reviewed Marx after Sraffa in Kyklos. The political scientist David McLellan wrote that Steedman's reading of Marx has been influential. The philosopher Roger Scruton wrote that Steedman provides the most notable argument against the labor theory of value from the New Left. The Marxist theorist Ernest Mandel considered Marx after Sraffa as another critique of Marx's Capital, and accused Steedman of misunderstandings of Marx similar to those made by Paul Sweezy in The Theory of Capitalist Development (1942). Steedman has been criticized for alleged misunderstandings of Karl Marx.

See also
 David Ricardo

References

Bibliography
Books

 
 
 

Journals

  

1977 non-fiction books
Books about Marxism
Economics books
English non-fiction books